Scarlett Bellamy is an American public health researcher who is a Professor of the Department of Epidemiology and Biostatistics at Drexel University. At Drexel she is Associate Dean of Diversity, Inclusion and Faculty Development.

Early life and education 
Bellamy was born in a rural own in North Carolina. She was raised by her grandparents. Her father's parents worked as farmers and her mother's mother worked in a hospital cafeteria. On the farm, Bellamy was involved with the summer harvest of tobacco, and learned to drive a tractor at the age of five. Bellamy spent her summer holidays taking part in a mathematics summer camp at North Carolina Central University. She was an undergraduate student at Hampton University, where she studied mathematics and graduated summa cum laude. She moved to Harvard University for graduate studies, where she focused on biostatistics. Bellamy completed her doctoral research at the Harvard T.H. Chan School of Public Health, supervised by Louise M. Ryan, where she made use of clustered data methods for community-based research. After graduating she worked as a statistical consultant for various organisations, including working on the East Boston Asthma Study.

Research and career 
Bellamy was appointed to the faculty at the Perelman School of Medicine at the University of Pennsylvania in 2001. She was eventually promoted to Professor of Biostatistics. In 2016, Bellamy joined Drexel University as a Professor of Biostatistics and Director of the biostatistics graduate program. Her research considers the efficacy of interventions in longitudinal behavioural modification trials. In particular, she has focused on HIV/AIDS, cardiovascular disease and healthy living.

Bellamy was elected a Fellow of the American Statistical Association in 2016. Bellamy was made President of the North American region in the International Biometric Society in 2017. She joined the adjunct faculty at the Harvard T.H. Chan School of Public Health in 2021, where she was responsible for providing career mentorship for people from historically marginalized groups.

Selected publications

References 

Year of birth missing (living people)
Living people
American women statisticians
Biostatisticians
Hampton University alumni
Harvard School of Public Health alumni
University of Pennsylvania faculty
Drexel University faculty
Fellows of the American Statistical Association
21st-century American women